The following is a list of match officials (referees, assistant referees, and video assistant referees) who officiated at the 2022 FIFA World Cup in Qatar.

FIFA appoints ten officials for each match of the tournament. This includes the on-site team of the referee, two assistant referees, the fourth official and the reserve assistant referee. At a centralised video operation room in Doha, the team of video match officials operate the video assistant referee (VAR) system. This team consists of the lead video assistant referee and three assistants, designated as the assistant VAR (AVAR1), the offside VAR (AVAR2) and the support VAR (AVAR3). Finally, a stand-by assistant VAR official is appointed for each match, used in case of a loss of connection between the stadium and the centralised video operation room. In such a scenario, a backup VAR room located in each stadium will be activated, with the fourth official serving as the video assistant referee (and the reserve assistant referee taking his place), and the stand-by assistant VAR serving as the assistant VAR.

For the first time in the history of the FIFA World Cup, the FIFA Referees Committee has also appointed three female referees and three female assistant referees.

Referees and assistant referees
On 19 May 2022, FIFA announced the list of 36 referees and 69 assistant referees from all six confederations for the 2022 FIFA World Cup. These were selected from an extended list of over 50 trios.

On 15 December 2022, FIFA announced that Polish referee Szymon Marciniak would adjudicate the final.

Video assistant referees
On 19 May 2022, FIFA announced 24 video assistant referees (VARs) had been appointed.

References

External links
List of match officials

Officials